C. Herman Plautz (October 20, 1844 – 1901) was a German American drug and chemical manufacturer and politician, born in Klein Sabow, Prussia, who served as a member of the City Clerk from 1885 to 1887 and as City Treasurer of Chicago from 1887 to 1889. Prior to entering politics, Plautz was responsible for the foundation of the Chicago Drug and Chemical Company. Plautz died in 1901.

References

1844 births
1901 deaths
German emigrants to the United States
Politicians from Chicago
19th-century American politicians
Illinois Republicans